Anthony Rouault (born 29 May 2001) is a French professional footballer who plays as a defender for  club Toulouse.

Career
Rouault joined the youth academy of Toulouse in 2016. He made his professional debut with Toulouse in a 1–0 Ligue 2 win over Ajaccio on 17 October 2020.

Honours
Toulouse
Ligue 2: 2021–22

Individual
UNFP Ligue 2 Team of the Year: 2021–22

References

External links
 
 
 Toulouse FC Profile

2001 births
Living people
People from Villeneuve-sur-Lot
Sportspeople from Lot-et-Garonne
French footballers
Footballers from Nouvelle-Aquitaine
Association football defenders
Ligue 1 players
Ligue 2 players
Championnat National 3 players
Toulouse FC players